Arnulfo Becerra (born 4 April 1962) is a Venezuelan footballer. He played in two matches for the Venezuela national football team in 1985. He was also part of Venezuela's squad for the 1991 Copa América tournament.

References

External links
 

1962 births
Living people
Venezuelan footballers
Venezuela international footballers
Place of birth missing (living people)
Association football defenders